KGIF (88.1 FM) is a non-commercial FM radio station owned by Leone Church of Christ. Licensed to Tafuna, American Samoa, it airs a religious format.

The station was assigned the KGIF call letters by the Federal Communications Commission on February 3, 2012.

References

External links
 
 

GIF
Radio stations established in 2012
Tafuna, American Samoa
2012 establishments in American Samoa